Tibor Tscheke had an early education in Heidelberg, studying at the Ruprecht-Karls-Universität from 1975 to 1979, where he received a Bachelor of Science in Computer Science and Mathematics.

In 1991, Tscheke helped establish the MAJOUR Modular Approach for Journals as part of the EWS European Workgroup on SGML. This work became the international base for commonly used metadata structures for scientific articles in the STM (Science, Technology, Medicine) fields' publishing industry.

From December 1991 - June 2001, Tscheke was the Managing Director and founding partner of STEP GmbH, a company which used SGML services for commercial, professional, and corporate publishers.

From July 2001 to February 2006, Tscheke was the Vice President International of Empolis GmbH, and was responsible for their activities in the US, UK, Hungary, Norway, and Dubai.

From March 2006 until the present, Tscheke has been the President and CEO of Ovitas Inc. Since 2007, Tscheke has also been a team member to execute and maintain the US GAAP (Generally Accepted Accounting Principles) Codification as part of Ovitas.

In 2013, Tscheke co-founded the open research and publishing platform ScienceOpen with Alexander Grossman, and currently serves as their Chief Strategy Officer.

Tscheke speaks four languages: English, German, Hungarian, and Serbo-Croatian.

References

Living people
German chief executives
Heidelberg University alumni
Open access publishers
Year of birth missing (living people)